Konrad Porzner (4 February 1935 – 1 December 2021) was a German politician. A member of the Social Democratic Party of Germany, he served in the Bundestag from 1962 to 1981 and again from 1983 to 1990.

References

1935 births
2021 deaths
Social Democratic Party of Germany politicians
Members of the Bundestag for Bavaria
People from Ansbach (district)
People of the Federal Intelligence Service